Douglas Charles "Dugger" McNeil (November 7, 1927 – January 18, 2015) was a Canadian politician. He represented the electoral district of Halifax St. Margarets in the Nova Scotia House of Assembly from 1967 to 1970 and Halifax West from 1963 to 1967. He was a member of the Nova Scotia Progressive Conservative Party.

McNeil was born in Halifax, Nova Scotia and graduated from high school there. He was a businessman, owning a store and restaurant. In 1954, he married Marion Josephine Peckham. McNeil also played ice hockey in the Quebec Senior Hockey League, Pacific Coast Hockey League, Maritime Major Hockey League, and Atlantic Coast Senior League between the years 1948 and 1955. McNeil died after a stroke on January 18, 2015.

References

External links

1927 births
2015 deaths
Progressive Conservative Association of Nova Scotia MLAs
Sportspeople from Halifax, Nova Scotia
Deaths in Canada